Mathy is a surname. Notable people with the surname include:

 François Mathy (born 1944), Belgian equestrian
 Karl Mathy (1807–1867), Badenian statesman
 Marianne Mathy (1890–1978), opera singer
 Reinhold Mathy (born 1962), German footballer
 Robin Mathy (born 1957), author, activist, and editor